Hicks Ridge is a rugged ridge located between Mount Soza and Morley Glacier in the Explorers Range of the Bowers Mountains in Victoria Land, Antarctica. It was first mapped by the United States Geological Survey from surveys and U.S. Navy air photos, 1960–62, and was named by the Advisory Committee on Antarctic Names for Thomas Hicks, U.S. Navy, a cook with the McMurdo Station winter party, 1967. The ridge lies situated on the Pennell Coast, a portion of Antarctica lying between Cape Williams and Cape Adare.

References

Ridges of Victoria Land
Pennell Coast